"The New Golden Age" is a crossover event in DC Comics publications. Written by Geoff Johns, the story follows the Justice Society of America unraveling a mystery following Golden Age heroes and villains. The story comprises an eponymous one-shot and the central storyline in the ongoing Justice Society of America, as well as a tie-in limited series following Stargirl titled Stargirl: The Lost Children.

Publication history
In August 2022, DC Comics announced "The New Golden Age", an event meant to reintroduce readers to the Justice Society of America and other Golden Age characters, as well as explore the past, present and future of the DC multiverse.

Plot

Prelude
In Star City, Green Arrow and Red Arrow are training on the rooftops as he tells Emiko about the time when he and Speedy ended up in the Golden Age of Superheroes and became part of the Seven Soldiers of Victory which consisted of Vigilante, Star-Spangled Kid, Stripesy, Shining Knight, and Crimson Avenger. They did lose a member whose grave stated "Unknown Soldier of Victory". Green Arrow and Red Arrow are then approached by the Jill Carlyle version of Crimson Avenger who states to Green Arrow that Lee Travis needs his help.

In Blue Valley, a voice-over narration from Courtney Whitmore has her recapping on when she found out her stepfather Pat Dugan was originally Star-Spangled Kid's sidekick and the day she became Stargirl. Arriving in Myrtle Beach, Stargirl and Pat Dugan hide the S.T.R.I.P.E. armor and arrive at the their hotel. Pat checks in with Barbara Whitmore where he states that he can't remember the last time he met with one of his old friends. At a restaurant called The Last Roundup, Pat tells Courtney about Shining Knight, Green Arrow, Crimson Avenger and his sidekick Wing, and Vigilante.

Just then, Jill Carlyle shows up and picks up Courtney and Pat where she takes them to where Green Arrow, Red Arrow, Vigilante, and Shining Knight (alongside his steed Winged Victory) are. While Pat gets re-acquainted with Green Arrow, Vigilante, and Shining Knight, Courtney meets Red Arrow. Jill Carlyle recaps to Courtney about how Wing sacrificed himself to help get Green Arrow and Speedy back to the present where his body was never found. She then takes Green Arrow, Vigilante, and Shining Knight away while stating that Courtney and Red Arrow are too young for this mission. Emiko then takes this time to inform Courtney about the day when Star-Spangled Kid was murdered as she revealed that she looked at the nearby files when nobody was looking. They are going after Clock King.

Later that night, Stargirl and Red Arrow move through the skies on her Cosmic Staff where they find the Seven Soldiers of Victory fighting Clock King on the shipwreck that Crimson Avenger died on as they find him alive. While S.T.R.I.P.E. asks Stargirl to get to Crimson Avenger, Red Arrow goes to Green Arrow who stated that he saw his future following that attack from Clock King. As Vigilante knocks out Clock King, Stargirl works to deactivate the time machine as Jill works to persuade Crimson Avenger to come with her. As Jill is told too late by Lee not to touch her, Stargirl has a vision of Wing running with two people with one of them stating that they can't leave Judy Garrick behind. A voice states to Stargirl that the Childminder is coming and that the lost sons and daughters need to be free. Crimson Avenger tells Stargirl to save Wing and to destroy Per Degaton's time machine before it swallows everything. Stargirl evacuates Jill Carlyle before the time machine imploded.

While Clock King's body was never found, Lee's body was. Courtney's voice-over narration states that the Justice Society of America and the Justice League were present at Lee's funeral. The next day, Courtney has breakfast with Pat and the Seven Soldiers of Victory as she tells them about the final thing that Lee told her. Later that night, Courtney is told by Red Arrow that she might have a lead on where Wing is. In 1940, Clock King arrives and is confronted by Per Degaton who warned him that the timestream is his domain. Per Degaton decides to use Clock King in his plan to hurt some people.

After Batman's gambit that involved the stabilization of the "Flashpoint" reality, Rip Hunter is told by Bonnie Baxter that the capsules containing the Thaddeus Brown version of Mister Miracle, the original Aquaman who predates Arthur Curry, the as-yet-unidentified Legionnaire of the Golden Age, Betsy Ross, Molly Pitcher, Ladybug, Quiz Kid, Salem the Witch Girl, Cherry Bomb, Harlequin's Son, Steel's great-uncle John Henry Jr., Jay Garrick's daughter Judy Garrick, and the original Red Lantern have failed and that these 13 superheroes have been returned to the 1940s which is rebuilding around them. Rip hopes that they will be re-integrated back into the 1940s without incident.

Main plot
Ten years from now on November 22, Helena Wayne is playing with her friends at Gotham Elementary School as her voice-over narration mentions about her seeing a mysterious person that she calls "The Stranger" (the name she gave for Per Degaton). On November 22, 1940, Johnny Thunder is preparing to take a photo of the Justice Society of America members Atom, Sandman, Spectre, Flash, Hawkman, Doctor Fate, Green Lantern, and Hourman. As Green Lantern states that the team is here, Sandman states that there will be more members as he has dreamed of it. When Atom asks Doctor Fate how many kids Mary and him are going to have, he is told that there are many possibilities as Nabu's magic is not used for entertainment. Though he does claim to Atom that he will have at least one. Flash states that he and Joan Garrick are thinking of starting a family. When Atom asks about Flash, Doctor Fate states that there are some "children lost". The Helmet of Fate starts heating up as Atom and Hawkman work to get it off while Doctor Fate states that he saw "tomorrow". On November 22, 3022, the ruins of the JSA's headquarters are found by the descendants of Green Lantern, Doctor Fate, and Atom as they are ambushed by the Stranger who kills Doctor Fate. Back in 1940, Kent Nelson has the Helmet of Fate off his head while having a nosebleed as the rest of the JSA state that he won't have to deal with this burden alone. On November 22, 1976, Doctor Mid-Nite examines Doctor Fate where he mentions about a female named Salem as Doctor Mid-Nite advises him to get some rest. Star-Spangled Kid and Power Girl come in to see if Doctor Fate is alright. When Power Girl states that they defeated Vulcan and she has proven herself to the JSA, Doctor Fate mentions how Wonder Woman would say something different from Power Girl's ability claim while mentioning that the Helmet of Fate has its gifts and curses. In the present, Kent's grand-nephew Khalid Nassour meets with Detective Chimp who tells him what he knows about the Helmet of Fate and that Deadman might help them exorcise Nabu from the Helmet of Fate. The club's bouncer Wylde won't let Detective Chimp in the club due to its "No shoes, no shirt, no service" rule. When Khalid puts on the Helmet of Fate and turns into Doctor Fate, he has a vision revolving around 3022 where Green Lantern and Atom fight the Stranger. Back in the 1940s, Alan Scott and Doiby Dickles read from a newspaper about Red Lantern burning a navy ship that left a dozen people dead. On October 31, 1951, Green Lantern, Flash, Doctor Mid-Nite, Wonder Woman, Atom, and Black Canary are before a Congressional committee. Back in the possible future, Helena's voice-over narration states that she is planning to hurt the Stranger like he had hurt her. When she heard a sound downstairs, she took a knife and went downstairs. When she found a shadowed figure, she stabs him and finds out that it is actually Batman. Helena now knows that her father Bruce Wayne is Batman as she asks if her mother knows. 13 years ago, Catwoman was in the middle of stealing the Cursed Shen Ring of Hauhet when she is confronted by Doctor Fate. She uses her whip to remove the Helmet of Fate from Doctor Fate and gets away as Doctor Fate warns her that the Stranger is going to kill her daughter. Back at Wayne Manor, Selina Kyle finds out about Helena discovering that Bruce is Batman and argues with him about her going down the possible path that his other sidekicks have gone down. In 1848 in Bel Air, Michigan, Corky Baxter is confronted by his fellow Time Masters as he is telling John Wilkes Booth not to kill someone at the Fort Theater. After Corky is reprimanded, the Time Masters reveal that some of the "thirteen" were lost before they can be reintegrated back into the 1940s and the ones in question are the children. Mime and Marionette are shown painting a room for their child. In the "Watchmen" universe, Cleopatra is working on getting in a building with Bubastis II to find the Watchman. 18 years from now, Helena is visited by someone. Back in the present, Khalid has informed Deadman and Detective Chimp of what he saw as Deadman suggests that they go find someone who is associated with Egyptian gods. 18 years from now, Selina is visited by two people. 13 years ago, Batman was found dead which devastated Selina as she is comforted by the JSA. Helena vows to avenge her father and becomes Huntress. The final panels show the bios of the original Aquaman, Betsy Ross and Molly Pitcher (who were the sidekicks to Miss America), Cherry Bomb (who was the sidekick of Human Bomb), Harlequin's Son (who is the son of the Molly Mayne version of Harlequin), John Henry Jr. (whose bio mentions the death of John Henry and how he brought the last of his murderers to justice), Judy Garrick in her superhero identity of "Boom", Ladybug (who was Red Bee's sidekick), Legionnaire (whose information was redacted and whose appearance is blacked out except for his ring), the Thaddeus Brown version of Mister Miracle, Quiz Kid (who was the sidekick of Mister Terrific), Salem the Witch Girl (who was the sidekick of Doctor Fate), and Red Lantern.

After points of Batman's history and her history are viewed, Huntress narrates about how she found out that the man who killed Batman was empowered by Frederic Vaux. She is shown interrogating a man named Falcone on where Doctor Fate is as she is assisted by Solomon Grundy. After speaking to The Ruby Sokov version of Red Lantern (who is the daughter of the Vladimir Sokov version) on how Salem wasn't found at the Tower of Fate. Huntress narrated that she put together an interim team at the suggestion of Khalid Nassour that consists of Power Girl, Solomon Grundy, Gentleman Ghost, Harlequin's Son, Icicle II, Mist, and Red Lantern II where none of them have found a lead in Khalid's disappearance. Helena talks to her mother about her visions. Two days later, the JSA find Doctor Fate's mummified body. Just then, the Stranger appears where he shoots Power Girl with a Kryptonite bullet where he claimed that he used the same gun to kill John F. Kennedy. He then proceeds to use his time-based abilities to revive and kill Gentleman Ghost, causes Solomon Grundy to rot, opens up the scars that Harlequin's Son sustained from his fight with Wildcat, freezes and shatters Icicle, overloads Red Lantern II, and ages Mist to death. With Huntress left alive, she tries to attack as the Stranger ages her. Catwoman then arrives and buys Huntress time to save the JSA from before an earlier year. Huntress' body ends up sent in time where it is found by Johnny Thunder and Thunderbolt.

Huntress awakens in a medical lab in November 1940 and makes her way down the hall and into a room where she meets the Justice Society members Flash, Hawkman, Atom, Doctor Fate, Green Lantern, Sandman, Spectre, Johnny Thunder, and Thunderbolt. Huntress introduces herself and states that she is from the future where her JSA team was murdered. When Thunderbolt states that he never met anyone from the future, Johnny Thunder reminds him that they met the Legionnaire who was from the future. Doctor Fate then peers into Huntress' fate and gets a magical feedback. It then cuts to Slaughter Swamp in 1941 where Doctor Fate and Salem the Witch Girl as he informs her about waking up here after encountering a JSA member from the future as someone is blocking his visions. When Doctor Fate doesn't remember Salem the Witch Girl, she had to remind him that she is his protege and how the Justice Society Dark tried to free her from the Limbo Town Curse. Salem the Witch Girl's sentient broom Sweep starts alerting them of danger as Mister Miracle is found getting attacked by Solomon Grundy who quotes "LEAVE! GRUNDY! ALONE!" When Doctor Fate asks where Zatara and Diamond Jack are, Mister Miracle states that they are having another spat. As Mister Miracle goes on the attack, Doctor Fate finds himself back in the JSA HQ in 1940 where his magical feedback knocks everyone down. Doctor Fate quotes to Nabu to show him the threat that Huntress speaks of. 10 years from now, Selina Kyle is called to Helena's school where her principal stated that Helena was cutting school where she claims that she saw the Stranger again. 15 years from now, Catwoman identifies the Stranger as Per Degaton who states that the snow globe turned Helena into a blind spot and ruining his ritual where the JSA must die. Per Degaton manages to kill Catwoman. Huntress has this vision as the snow glove acts up. In 1941, Mister Miracle has chained up Solomon Grundy while stating that they should apprehend Bride of Grundy. Salem the Witch Girl quotes to Doctor Fate "Now about my curse..." 13 years ago, Catwoman tells Holly Robinson that it's money. 8 years ago, Extant takes down Doctor Fate. One year ago, Khalid Nassour receives the Helmet of Fate. Huntress then wakes up where she finds herself in the company of Doctor Fate, Detective Chimp, and Deadman. Detective Chimp states that they can do a round of introductions over a drink with the first round on Deadman.

Subplot
On April 13, 1942, two criminals named the Fox and the Crow have committed a robbery as they are being pursued by TNT and Dan the Dyna-Mite who defeat them. Six months ago, Dan the Dyna-Mite in his alter ego of Daniel Dunbar reminisces about TNT getting killed in action. In Blue Valley, Courtney Whitmore does a voice-over narration about Pat's history and how they as Stargirl and S.T.R.I.P.E. defeated Dragon King and Shiv. Barbara Whitmore grounds Courtney due to her slipping grades and will only grant her a pass if it is a major JSA assignment. Pat claims that Wing is still buried in his grave after a visit to it and that the displaced Crimson Avenger claimed that his Wing was alive as Pat claims that she still has friends in Jakeem Thunder and Cyclone. Later that night, Courtney is visited by Red Arrow who has a lead on where Wing is. She tells Red Arrow about Crimson Avenger's claims of the Childminder and the lost children. Changing into Stargirl, Courtney states to Red Arrow that she has to be back before the sun rises. At the house of Dan Dunbar, Stargirl and Red Arrow do some investigating as they recap about TNT's work with the Young All-Stars and the exploits of Sylvester Pemberton's sister Merry Pemberton. Red Arrow mentioned that Miss America's sidekicks Betsy Ross and Molly Pitcher disappeared after World War II and the disappearances of John Henry Jr. and Cherry Bomb as well as Hourman's sidekick Tick-Tock disappearing during an investigation into a Miraclo hijacking. Both of them then hear some message meant for Dan on the radio until an explosion happens telling them to find them. After crashing into an island where he saves his rings, Daniel finds himself younger as a voice states to Dan that he shouldn't have come here.

In the Arrow Cave, Stargirl is shown around the Arrow Cave by Red Arrow as she is then shown the map of Starfish Island where Red Arrow was raised by her captor at a young age. She also mentions to Stargirl that Daniel Dunbar was looking for the missing sidekicks as Stargirl states that they should set sail and find the missing sidekicks. While out at sea, Stargirl and Red Arrow trace Daniel's last known resarch to an island in the Diablo Triangle. Looking at the images of the missing sidekicks, Stargirl recognizes the Newsboy Legion and notes that she knew their clones which is a long story. Then she notes that Betsy Ross and Molly Pitcher disappeared after World War II and Cherry Bomb disappeared while Human Bomb was trying to cure her. Stargirl's narration has her stating that Red Arrow fell asleep researching Ladybug who disappeared like the others and would've been in her 90s by now. Stargirl then has a vision from Air Wave stating that they are too close and that he is trapped with the children as the boat is attacked. After Red Arrow swims Stargirl to the surface, they see an island nearby. They find that the sand is similar to Miraclo. Before they can call Pat, Stargirl and Red Arrow are attacked by egg-shaped robots called Child Collectors. One of the Child Collectors traps Red Arrow inside it completing the nesting programming and flies off. Stargirl finds herself saved by Air Wave, Cherry Bomb, Wing, and Robotman's creation Robbie the Robot Dog. Wing states that they are on Orphan Island and that they can escape as Robbie the Robot Dog states that the only way off this island is death.

Red Arrow wakes in her cell as a prisoner of the Childminder. Meanwhile, Stargirl is running with Air Wave, Cherry Bomb, Robbie the Robot Dog, and Wing. Stargirl starts to search from the skies as Air Wave blocks an attack towards her. Cherry Bomb does an explosion to slow their fall as Wing and Cherry Bomb catch Stargirl and Air Wave. The Child Collectors then attack causing them to make their way to Hangman's Treehouse. On the other side of the island, Red Arrow wakes up to the voice of her imprisoned neighbor. A person informs Red Arrow that she is just another person forgotten by their parents and friends with plans to protect them from neglectful adults. Red Arrow asks the person visiting her it's identity. The person identifies herself as the Childminder. As Robbie the Robot Dog stands guard outside of the waterfall since he can't deal with water, Stargirl is led into a cave by Air Wave, Cherry Bomb, and Wing. Stargirl takes this time to recap how Pat Dugan knew Robert Crane. Wing introduces Stargirl to the Lost Children consisting of Little Miss Redhead and her companions the Blue Boys, the Newsboy Legion (who were sidekicks to Guardian), Tick-Tock of Hourman's Minute Men of America (who came up with this code name to standout and is the first one to appear on the island), John Henry Jr. (who found himself on the island while searching for John Henry's second sledgehammer), Betsy Ross, Molly Pitcher, Ladybug, Salem the Witch Girl, and Quiz Kid. After the introductions are done, Corky Baxter arrives stating that he might have a way for them to get off the island while noting that he is Rip Hunter's protege. He states that they an unravel this "purgatory" the moment they find Jay Garrick's daughter Boom and give some business to the person responsible. Back at the Childminder's castle, Red Arrow tries to fight Childminder only to be defeated and subjected to brief amnesia. The neighboring inmate speaks again stating that the inmate is too fast for Childminder's amnesia dust. When Red Arrow asks who the person is, the neighboring inmate is revealed to be Boom who is chained up to a special treadmill. She states that she will need Red Arrow's help to get back to her parents as "they gotta be worried sick by now".

Corky Baxter narrates to the Lost Children how the Time Masters have noticed how Flash had once changed the timeline which became a mess. While in the timestream, the Time Masters were attacked and didn't make it back to their own time as they ended up in the Divine Continuum. Corky states to Stargirl and the Lost Children that they will have to do as he says if they are going to get off the island as Quiz Kid claims that this island must be cut off from the rest of the world and time. When Wing asks why Childminder brought them to Orphan Island, Corky states that Childminder is going to sell you and holds Batman responsible for recreating the Flashpoint reality. This caused the Time Scavengers to take action with Childminder being one of them. When Stargirl asks if this is why she never heard of any of these kids, Corky states that they disappeared from history and the Time Masters rescued them from Limbo in order to keep them from being erased. The Time Masters wanted to hold on to them until the timeline was fully restored. Due to the attack on the timestream, Childminder pulled the children to Orphan Island. When asked by Salem the Witch Girl on how long they were here, Corky states that time stands still on Orphan Island. Betsy Ross and Molly Pitcher asked about Miss America and their families as Quiz Kid states that their families won't forget them when they are returned to their own times as Corky confirms that claim. John Henry Jr. states that it would be like they never left, Ladybug states that she doesn't want her parents to worry, and Cherry Bomb wants to blow up Childminder before they can return to their own time. Stargirl then asks who Childminder is going to sell the children to. Corky states that he can't answer that question yet as they need to storm the castle and free her prisoners before the buyer arrives. At Childminder's castle, Childminder passes the cells of Blue Beetle's sidekick Sparky and Pinky the Whiz Kid who vow to get out and make her pay for what she did to them. Secret is held in a special cell claiming that Childminder is lying about helping them. Childminder states that she is giving them new purpose. She then activates a Time Warp machine that forces Boom to run fast on her treadmill as she tells Red Arrow that she starts seeing the like that Childminder took from her every time the Time Warp machine is activated. As Childminder tells the buyer that she has the buyer, Red Arrow advises Boom to overload the machine. Corky gets word from his friend Crockett that the buyer is on it's way. Air Wave starts having a bad reaction to all the signals causing everyone to make their way towards Childminder's castle. Outside Childminder's castle, Molly Pitcher uses her pitcher to make weapons for those who don't have weapons. Stargirl and Corky lead the charge fighting against the Child Collectors as Robbie the Robot Dog notes that there are a lot of them. When asked by Stargirl if he can connect to them, Robbie states that these Child Collectors are made from futuristic technology of Stargirl's time as he is just a clockwork mutt. Cherry Bomb and John Henry Jr. are comfortable against the odds while Salem the Witch Girl uses her magic to save some of the Newsboy Legion. As Boom states that she is seeing her dad again, she also sees someone that is supposed to be a friend. Corky gets word that the buyer is on the island. Childminder greets the buyer who turns out to be the android version of Hourman who is here for the children.

Titles

Prelude issues

Main issues

Tie-in issues

See also
 Golden Age of Comic Books

References

DC Comics one-shots
One-shot comic titles
DC Comics storylines
Superhero comics
DC Comics titles
2022 in comics
Storylines in comics
Justice Society of America
Golden Age of Comic Books